Shahrak-e Hamzeh (also Romanized as Shahrak-e Ḩamzeh) is a village in Kheybar Rural District, Choghamish District, Dezful County, Khuzestan Province, Iran. At the 2006 census, its population was 1,959, in 376 families.

References 

Populated places in Dezful County